This article contains an overview of the year 1984 in the sport of athletics.

International Events
African Championships in  Rabat, Morocco
Balkan Games in  Athens, Greece
European Indoor Championships in  Gothenburg, Sweden
World Cross Country Championships in  New York, United States
Olympic Games in  Los Angeles, United States

World records

Men

Women

Marita Koch (GDR) equals her own world record in the women's 200 metres held since 1979-06-10, clocking 21.71 seconds on 1984-07-21 at a meet in Potsdam.

Men's Best Year Performers

100 metresMain race this year: Olympic Games 100 metres200 metresMain race this year: Olympic Games 200 metres400 metresMain race this year: Olympic Games 400 metres800 metresMain race this year: Olympic Games 800 metres1,500 metresMain race this year: Olympic Games 1,500 metres5,000 metresMain race this year: Olympic Games 5,000 metres10,000 metresMain race this year: Olympic Games 10,000 metresHalf Marathon

110m HurdlesMain race this year: Olympic Games 110m Hurdles400m HurdlesMain race this year: Olympic Games 400m Hurdles3,000m SteeplechaseMain race this year: Olympic Games 3,000m SteeplechaseHigh JumpMain competition this year: Olympic Games High JumpLong JumpMain competition this year: Olympic Games Long JumpTriple JumpMain competition this year: Olympic Games Triple JumpDiscusMain competition this year: Olympic Games Discus ThrowHammer

Shot PutMain competition this year: Olympic Games Shot PutJavelinMain competition this year: Olympic Games Javelin ThrowPole VaultMain competition this year: Olympic Games Pole VaultDecathlonMain competition this year: Olympic Games DecathlonWomen's Best Year Performers

100 metresMain race this year: Olympic Games 100 metres200 metresMain race this year: Olympic Games 200 metres400 metresMain race this year: Olympic Games 400 metres800 metresMain race this year: Olympic Games 800 metres1,500 metresMain race this year: Olympic Games 1,500 metresMile

3,000 metresMain race this year: Olympic Games 3,000 metres5,000 metres

10,000 metres

Half Marathon

100m HurdlesMain race this year: Olympic Games 100m Hurdles400m HurdlesMain race this year: Olympic Games 400m HurdlesHigh JumpMain competition this year: Olympic Games High JumpLong JumpMain competition this year: Olympic Games Long JumpDiscusMain competition this year: Olympic Games Discus ThrowShot PutMain competition this year: Olympic Games Shot PutJavelin (old design)Main competition this year: Olympic Games Javelin ThrowHeptathlonMain competition this year: Olympic Games Heptathlon''

Marathon

Year Rankings

Men

Women

International Races

Births

January
 January 9 — Firehiwot Dado, Ethiopian long-distance runner
 January 10 — Solomon Busendich, Kenyan long-distance runner
 January 14 — Teemu Wirkkala, Finnish javelin thrower
 January 16 — Yuki Yamazaki, Japanese race walker
 January 19 — Jarkko Kinnunen, Finnish race walker
 January 20 — Andriy Yurin, Ukrainian race walker

February
 February 13 — Eric Matthias, British Virgin Islands discus thrower
 February 20 — Zhu Xiaolin, Chinese long-distance runner
 February 22 — Yuki Yamaguchi, Japanese sprinter
 February 25 — Xing Huina, Chinese athlete

March
 March 24 — Lucy Kabuu, Kenyan long distance runner
 March 24 — Jacopo Marin, Italian sprinter
 March 27 — Roman Valiyev, Kazakhstani triple jumper
 March 31 — Anna Pierce, American middle distance runner

April
 April 2 — Germán Lauro, Argentine shot putter
 April 17 — Pavel Kryvitski, Belarusian hammer thrower
 April 19 — Martin Marić, Croatian discus thrower
 April 26 — Petrina Price, Australian high jumper
 April 30 — Yevhen Vynohradov, Ukrainian hammer thrower

May
 May 1 — Louis Tristán, Peruvian long jumper
 May 8 — Andreas Mokdasi, Swedish sprinter
 May 10 — Alana Boyd, Australian pole vaulter

June
 June 17 — Michael Mathieu, Bahamian sprinter
 June 30 — Gretchen Quintana, Cuban heptathlete

July
 July 7 — Inna Poluškina, Latvian long-distance runner
 July 8 — Mariem Alaoui Selsouli, Moroccan middle/long-distance runner
 July 9 — Olusoji Fasuba, Nigerian sprinter
 July 22 — He Dan, Chinese race walker
 July 25 — Javier Culson, Puerto Rican hurdler
 July 26 — Kyriakos Ioannou, Cypriot high jumper

August
 August 4 — Xing Shucai, Chinese race walker

September
 September 3 — David Fiegen, Luxembourgian middle distance runner
 September 9 — Andrey Silnov, Russian high jumper
 September 10 — Ismail Ahmed Ismail, Sudanese runner
 September 26 — Michael Letterlough, Caymanian hammer thrower

October
 October 6 — Adina Anton, Romanian long jumper
 October 14 — Svetlana Bolshakova, Russian-born Belgian triple jumper
 October 24 — Christian Reif, German long jumper.
 October 24 — Sultana Frizell, Canadian hammer thrower
 October 28 — Anyika Onuora, British sprinter

November
 November 10 — Andrej Poljanec, Slovenian pole vaulter
 November 12 — Siraj Gena, Ethiopian long-distance runner

December
 December 15 — Véronique Mang, Cameroon-born French athlete
 December 26 — Alex Schwazer, Italian race walker
 December 28 — Kimberley Mickle, Australian javelin thrower
 December 31 — Mohamed Faraj Al-Kaabi, Qatari hammer thrower

Deaths
January 10 — Toivo Loukola (81), Finnish athlete (b. 1902)
March 15 — Ken Carpenter (70), American discus thrower (b. 1913)
June 1 — Sten Pettersson (81), Swedish hurdler (b. 1902)

References
 Association of Road Racing Statisticians
 Year Rankings

 
Athletics (track and field) by year